The Air Force–Colorado State football rivalry is an American college football rivalry in Colorado between the U.S. Air Force Academy Falcons and Colorado State University Rams. The Ram–Falcon Trophy is awarded to the winner of the game.

Ram–Falcon Trophy
The origin of the Ram–Falcon Trophy is traced back to Shelly Godkin, a former ROTC commander at Colorado State. He watched the teams play in 1978 and sought to translate his impressions into a trophy symbolic of an annual game.

It was first awarded in 1980, when formerly independent Air Force joined Colorado State in the Western Athletic Conference (WAC); CSU won 21–9 on September 6. Both teams moved to the new Mountain West Conference in 1999; Air Force leads the trophy series .

Series results
Rankings are from the AP Poll.

See also 
 List of NCAA college football rivalry games

References

 

College football rivalries in the United States
Air Force Falcons football
Colorado State Rams football
1957 establishments in Colorado